Christ the King is a statue of Jesus Christ in Świebodzin, western Poland, completed on 6 November 2010. It took five years in total to construct and cost around $1.5 million to build, which was collected from donations of the 21,000 residents of the town. Since its completion in 2010, the statue has been featured in 10 Most Today’s, “Ten Most Famous Jesus Statues in the World” in 2013 and SpiritualRay’s “Fourteen Most Famous Statues of Jesus Around the World” in 2018. The world’s tallest Jesus statue also became the only Jesus statue with its own antennae and WiFi connection. It remains the tallest Jesus statue in the world according to the Guinness Book of World Records.

Characteristics
The statue  was built on a  embankment of stones and rubble. It weighs 440 tons. It is composed of concrete and fibreglass.

It features both WiFi antenna, which according to the local parish controls the ISP and surveillance cameras.

Design
The designs for various elements of the statue were produced by a number of individuals; the sculpture design was primarily produced by Mirosław Kazimierz Patecki with the technical design aspect being undertaken by Assoc. Jakub Marcinowski and Assoc. Mikołaj Kłapeć, both of whom are employees of the University of Zielona Gora. Meanwhile, elements of the clothing and the arms of the statue were designed by Tomasz Stafiniak and Krzysztof Nawojski  (the latter being of the town of Świebodzin) respectively. Another resident of Świebodzin, Marian Wybraniec, was responsible for the design of the foundations upon which the statue was constructed.

The construction work was undertaken by staff employed by the Sanctuary of Divine Mercy in Świebodzin and included welders, locksmiths and mechanics.

Construction
On 29 September 2006, the city council of Świebodzin passed a resolution on the establishment of Christ the King. The President (under the authority of the board) along with the mayor spoke to the Bishop of Zielona Góra-Gorzów Diocese. State officials also temporarily halted the project due to safety concerns. With funding from local people and as far away as Canada, the statue was completed on 6 November 2010 and was at the time the Largest Statue of Jesus Christ according to the Guinness Book of World Records.

See also
Mug (2018 film)
List of statues of Jesus
List of tallest statues

Notes

References

External links

 The official Website of the Christ the King Statue (Polish, German, English, Russian)
 Aerial 360 Panorama of the Statue

Art Deco sculptures and memorials
Monuments and memorials in Poland
Outdoor sculptures in Poland
Buildings and structures in Lubusz Voivodeship
Colossal statues of Jesus
Świebodzin County
Christ the King
Religious buildings and structures completed in 2010
Tourist attractions in Lubusz Voivodeship
2010 establishments in Poland